Samuele Longo (born 12 January 1992) is an Italian professional footballer who plays as a striker for Dutch club Dordrecht.

Club career

Early career
Born in Valdobbiadene, Province of Treviso, Veneto, Longo started his career at Treviso FBC 1993. He was the member of Esordienti under-13 team in 2004–05 season. In January 2009 Internazionale bought Longo and Mame Baba Thiam outright.

Longo spent the rest of 2008–09 season in Treviso's Allievi Nazionali under-17 team in a temporary deal before formally became an Inter player on 1 July 2009.

Internazionale

Youth
2009–10
Longo was a junior member of Inter's reserve team in the 2009–10 season, as a backup for Denis Alibec, Mattia Destro and Simone Dell'Agnello. On 28 January 2010, after being sparingly used by Inter, he left for Piacenza Calcio, along with Giuseppe Angarano and Luca Stocchi. In total, Longo only played 4 times in the reserve league that season.

2010–11
In the 2010–2011 season, despite Inter trimming their reserve squad (only composed only of U18 and U19 players plus 3 U20), Longo was unable to become a regular starter, with 11 appearances, (2 starts) and 2 goals. In January 2011 he moved to Genoa in a temporary deal with option to sign Longo in co-ownership deal, also as a replacement of outgoing reserve forward Gianmarco Zigoni. Longo scored 3 goals for Genoa and 2 goals for Inter in 2010–11 reserve league. He also appeared in the league's play-offs, losing to eventual champions Roma in the semifinals, forming a partnership with Richmond Boakye; his side was also eliminated by Inter in the quarter-finals of 2011 Torneo di Viareggio.

2011–12
In June 2011 Genoa signed Destro outright from Inter for €4.5M, as well as half of the registration rights of Longo for a peppercorn fee of €500 (also made Inter had to write-down €47,000 for the residual accounting value of his contract). He returned to Inter in temporary deal on 1 July 2011, being again assigned to the reserves. Longo was a regular starter for the side, but was unable to be the topscorer, scoring eight goals times during the regular season (attacking midfielder Daniel Bessa eventually scored ten times).

Under Andrea Stramaccioni, Longo scored 5 goals in 2011–12 NextGen series as one of the team that won the tournament; his role also sightly changed after the arrival of Marko Livaja as new centre forward, in 4–2–3–1 (and later 4–3–3/4–3–2–1 formation under Daniele Bernazzani). He was also instrumental in the Primavera final stages, netting four goals in three matches (including a brace in the final against Lazio).

First-team
2011–12
Longo was assigned number 81 shirt at the start of 2011–12 season, and played the first four friendlies of the season under former Genoa first team coach Gian Piero Gasperini. However he was left out of the squad submitted for 2011–12 UEFA Champions League, with Giovanni Terrani being included instead.

Longo made his professional debut on 13 May 2012, playing the last 14 minutes of a 1–3 away loss against Lazio.

2012–13
Longo scored his first goal for Inter against Indonesia League Selection on 24 May 2012. In June 2012, Genoa CEO Pietro Lo Monaco once confirmed the co-ownership was renewed but on the deadline date Internazionale bought back Longo for €7 million and sold Juraj Kucka back to Genoa for €6.5 million.

Longo made his international debut on 9 August, coming on as a second half substitute in a 0–2 home loss against Hajduk Split for the season's Europa League.

Loan to Espanyol
On 28 August 2012 Longo joined Spanish side RCD Espanyol of La Liga on a season-long loan deal, following in the footsteps of Internazionale teammate Philippe Coutinho, who spent the final six months of the 2011–12 campaign at Estadi Cornellà-El Prat. On 2 September he made his debut abroad, scoring the first of a 2–3 away loss against Levante. Longo scored his second goal on the 16th, in a 3–3 home draw against Athletic Bilbao, but was later sent off due to his celebration.

Longo's third goal for the Catalans came on 17 November, but in a 1–2 away defeat against Valencia CF. He finished the season with 18 appearances, including 11 starts.

Loan to Verona
On 20 August 2013 Longo joined Verona, recently promoted to Serie A, in a season-long loan deal. However, he only appeared twice in the season (against Cagliari and Roma), all from the bench.

Loan to Rayo Vallecano
On 31 January 2014 Longo joined fellow top-divisioner Rayo Vallecano on loan until the end of the season.

Loan to Girona
On 16 July 2016, after another loan stints at Cagliari and Frosinone, Longo was loaned to Spanish Segunda División side Girona FC for one year. He made his debut on 21 August, a debut which brought his first goal of the season as well, in a 3–3 away draw against Sevilla Atlético, in the opening league match of 2016–17 season.

At the end of 2016–17 season, Longo returned to Inter. He was part of the squad in the first day of pre-season training.

Loan to Tenerife
On 23 August 2017, Longo was sent on loan at fellow Segunda División side Tenerife for the 2017–18 season.

Loan to Huesca
On 5 July 2018, Longo was loaned to SD Huesca, newly promoted to La Liga, on a one-year deal with an obligation to make it permanent.

Loan to Cremonese
On 30 January 2019, Longo joined Serie B side Cremonese on loan until 30 June 2019 with an obligation to make the deal permanent if Cremonese won promotion to Serie A.

Loan to Deportivo La Coruña
On 16 August 2019, Longo joined Spanish side Deportivo La Coruña on loan until 30 June 2020 with an obligation to make the deal permanent if the club won promotion to La Liga.

Loan to Venezia
On 31 January 2020, Longo joined Serie B club Venezia on loan until 30 June 2020.

Vicenza
On 5 October 2020, he signed a three-year contract with Serie B club Vicenza.

Loan to Modena
On 31 January 2022, Longo joined Modena on loan with an option to buy and a conditional obligation to buy.

Dordrecht
On 3 August 2022, Longo moved to Dordrecht in the Netherlands.

International career
Samuele Longo made his U20 debut on 31 August 2011 as starting forward, the first match of coach Luigi Di Biagio. Longo scored the opening goal for Italy in the first round of 2011–12 Four Nations. In the next match he substituted Genoa team-mate Giacomo Beretta in 65th minute. He also played the next match against Germany as sub for Manuel Fischnaller. In the fourth match Longo was the starting forward again. Rested for the fifth round, Longo returned to the squad as a substitute for Sansone in the sixth round against Germany again, scored another goal.

In April 2012, Longo received his first U21 call-up. Ciro Ferrara made a more experimental squad without some U21 regular. Inter team-mate Faraoni and Juventus player Marrone left the squad before the match as the match was overlapped with mid-week rescheduled week 33 of Serie A. It made the squad consist of 16 Serie B players and three Serie A players (but from the reserve) Longo, Viviani and De Sciglio, with the latter two received call-up only after the withdrew of the two original Serie A members. Despite a more immature squad, Azzurrini won Scotland 4–1. Longo scored a goal as the substitute of Ciro Immobile. In June 2012 Ferrara dropped 7 players from April squad (19+2), and add 9 new and old players to the squad. Longo, who had to play for the reserve, was dropped along with 3 other forwards.

Longo played 1 game in 2013 U21 Euro qualification (against Liechtenstein 6 September 2012) and 7 games in 2015 U21 Euro qualification. He was included in 27-men preliminary squad for the final tournament. He was dropped on 7 June 2015.

Career statistics

Honours

Club
Inter Primavera
 NextGen series: 2011–12
 Campionato Nazionale Primavera: 2011–12

Individual
Best Player of playoffs: 2012

References

External links

FIGC 

1992 births
Living people
People from Valdobbiadene
Footballers from Veneto
Italian footballers
Association football forwards
Serie A players
Serie B players
Serie C players
Treviso F.B.C. 1993 players
Inter Milan players
Piacenza Calcio 1919 players
Genoa C.F.C. players
Hellas Verona F.C. players
Cagliari Calcio players
Frosinone Calcio players
U.S. Cremonese players
Venezia F.C. players
L.R. Vicenza players
Modena F.C. players
La Liga players
Segunda División players
RCD Espanyol footballers
Rayo Vallecano players
Girona FC players
CD Tenerife players
SD Huesca footballers
Deportivo de La Coruña players
FC Dordrecht players
Eerste Divisie players
Italian expatriate footballers
Italian expatriate sportspeople in Spain
Expatriate footballers in Spain
Italian expatriate sportspeople in the Netherlands
Expatriate footballers in the Netherlands
Italy youth international footballers
Italy under-21 international footballers
Sportspeople from the Province of Treviso